Santa Ana College is a public community college in Santa Ana, California.

History
In 1915, Santa Ana Junior College opened its doors to 25 students as a department of Santa Ana High School.  It was the second community college founded in Orange County, behind Fullerton College, and the fourth oldest in all of California. In 1932, a charter of Gamma Sigma Fraternity International was granted. Beta Alpha Chapter was at the school from 1932 to 1938 but anti-fraternity agitation and lack of communication with the organization in the east made the chapter dormant by 1938. The 1933 Long Beach earthquake damaged the Santa Ana High School building, prompting the campus move to North Main Street where it remained until 1947. A bond issue passed in 1945, paving the way for development of a 48-acre (194,000 m²) campus at its current location. Santa Ana College plays host to Middle College High School, a small alternative high school in the Santa Ana Unified School District in which students can earn their Associate of Arts degree at the same time as their high school diploma. In the late 1970s the college purchased the properties on Martha Lane south of the original campus and that land is now part of the parking lot. Recent years have witnessed the further development of and annexation of adjacent property to the original location.

For a short time, the college was known as Rancho Santiago College, but the name changed back to Santa Ana College in the late 1990s.

In 1985, a satellite campus, what is now called Santiago Canyon College was established in Orange, California.  Santiago Canyon has since grown in size to become a separate college from Santa Ana College (although both colleges are part of the Rancho Santiago Community College District).

Academics
The college has various programs lead to the awarding of associate degrees in Arts and Sciences, as well as vocational certificates.

Santa Ana College is also home to the Tessmann Planetarium which was renovated and now has a state-of-the art planetarium system. It is the largest, both in diameter (30 ft) and seating capacity planetarium in the County of Orange CA. It was completed and became operational in 1967.

Santa Ana College is also home to Around and About Orange County News and Noticiero Latino del Condado de Orange (NLCO), student-produced weekly news shows. NLCO became the first Spanish language college newscast produced by a community college.

The TV Department uses the college's Digital Media Center to produce, shoot, and edit the college's newscast.

The Communication & Media Studies Department also uses the college's Digital Media Center to write, edit, and publish the college's online and printed news called el Don News

Athletics
Santa Ana College sponsors 18 sports programs. The 9 men's sports programs are baseball, basketball, cross country, football, soccer, swimming, track and field, water polo and wrestling. The 9 women's programs are basketball, beach volleyball, cross country, soccer, softball, swimming, track and field, volleyball and water polo.

Notable alumni
 Duane Allen, NFL player
 Barry Asher, Hall of Fame bowler
 Heath Bell, retired MLB All-Star Pitcher
 Bob Boyd, Basketball coach
 Lem Burnham, NFL player
 George Brancato, NFL player and CFL All-star
 Al Carmichael, NFL player
 Ed Caruthers, high jump olympian
 Nancy Fuller, host of Food Network's Farmhouse Rules
 Robert David Hall, Actor on the television series CSI: Crime Scene Investigation.
 Bob Hamelin, MLB player
 Diane Keaton, Academy Award-winning actress
 Khan Malaythong, Olympic Badminton player
 Cathy Marino, Team USA Kayak in the 1988 and 1992 Olympics.
 Yael Markovich, Israeli/American model and beauty queen/pageant titleholder (Miss Israel)
 Steve Martin, Emmy and Grammy winning actor
 Kris Medlen, former MLB pitcher for the Kansas City Royals, Atlanta Braves, and Arizona Diamondbacks.
 Dan Meyer, MLB player
 Louie Olivos Jr., Actor, promoter, producer, director and playwright
 Rick Ownbey, MLB player
 Kasey Peters, American football player
 John Pitts, NFL player
 Jim Steffen, NFL player
 Larry Stuart  World record setting javelin thrower
 Joe Taufeteʻe, rugby player
 Bill Thomas, Member of the United States House of Representatives
 Bob Webster, Diving champion who won gold medals at both the 1960 and 1964 Olympic games
 Ray Willsey football coach
 CJ Wilson – Class of 1998 – Baseball player: Los Angeles Angels of Anaheim starting pitcher
 Jose Vasquez, Professional soccer player
 Gaddi Vasquez, United States Ambassador to the United Nations Agencies for Food and Agriculture and Director of the Peace Corps
 Tony Zendejas, former NFL kicker

References

External links
Official website

California Community Colleges
Education in Santa Ana, California
Universities and colleges in Orange County, California
Sports in Santa Ana, California
Educational institutions established in 1915
1915 establishments in California
Two-year colleges in the United States